Let's Polka 'Round is an album by Jimmy Sturr and His Orchestra, released through Rounder Records on August 26, 2003. In 2004, the album won Sturr the Grammy Award for Best Polka Album.

Track listing
 "Polka Round" (Wing) – 2:18
 "Night Train to Memphis" (Bradley, Hughes, Smith) – 2:38
 "Lawn Party" – 2:02
 "Polka on the Banjo" – 3:34 (Bela Fleck)
 "Yakety Sax" (Boots Randolph, Rich) – 2:19
 "Laura's" – 2:22
 "Together You and I" (Dolly Parton) – 2:23
 "Charlie Was a Boxer" – 2:36
 "I'm Walkin'" (Dave Bartholomew, Fats Domino) – 2:40
 "You Came into My Life" – 4:11
 "Lucky Seven" – 2:11
 "Tavern in the Town"  – 2:07
 "Little Felix" – 3:20

Personnel

 Scott Alarik – Liner Notes
 Joe Babcock – Vocals (background)
 Ray Barno Orchestra – Clarinet, Sax (Baritone), Group Member
 Dave Bartholomew – Composer
 Blue Highway – Vocals (background)
 Bradley – Composer
 Mark Capps – Assistant
 Michael Cleveland – Fiddle, Group Member
 Dennis Coyman – Drums, Group Member
 Wally Czerniawski – Accordion, Arranger, Group Member
 Charlie Daniels – Vocals, Guest Appearance
 Ray DeBrown – Arranger
 Nick Devito – Clarinet, Sax (Alto), Group Member
 Fats Domino – Composer
 Joe Donofrio – Producer, Mixing
 Béla Fleck – Guest Appearance
 Rod Fletcher – Vocals (background)
 Dave Grego – Bass, Group Member
 Ken Harbus – Trumpet, Group Member
 Allen Henson – Vocals (background)
 Bobby Hicks – Fiddle, Group Member
 Marvin Hughes – Composer
 Ken Irwin – Producer, Mixing
 Johnny Karas – Sax (Tenor), Vocals, Group Member

 Dave Kowalski – Engineer
 Shawn Lane – Guest Appearance, Group Member
 Dr. Toby Mountain – Mastering
 Mrs. T's Pierogies – Author
 Al Noble – Trumpet, Group Member
 Louis Dean Nunley – Vocals (background)
 Eric Parks – Trumpet, Group Member
 Dolly Parton – Composer
 Al Piatkowski – Accordion, Group Member
 Tom Pick – Producer, Engineer, Mixing
 Boots Randolph – Composer, Guest Appearance
 James Rich – Composer
 Keith Slattery – Piano
 Harry Beasley Smith – Composer
 Tim Stafford – Guest Appearance, Group Member
 Gerry Stavisky – Clarinet, Sax (Alto), Group Member
 Ron Stewart – Fiddle, Group Member
 Jimmy Sturr – Arranger, Conductor, Producer, Mixing
 Wayne Taylor – Guest Appearance, Group Member
 Frank Urbanovitch – Fiddle, Vocals
 Jeremy Welch – Assistant
 Henry Will – Arranger
 Dennis Wilson – Vocals (background)
 Lance Wing – Composer

See also
 Polka in the United States

References

2003 albums
Grammy Award for Best Polka Album
Jimmy Sturr albums
Rounder Records albums